Andrea Mandorlini (born 17 July 1960) is an Italian football manager and former defender, currently in charge of  club Mantova.

Playing career
Mandorlini made his playing debut on 4 February 1979 with Torino. He left Torino in 1980 to join then-Serie B team Atalanta. After three seasons with Ascoli from 1981 to 1984, he signed for Inter, where he played until 1991. With the nerazzurri jersey, he won a Serie A championship (scudetto) in 1989 and a UEFA Cup in 1991. After two seasons with Udinese from 1991 to 1993, he announced his retirement from playing football.

Managerial career
After his retirement, Mandorlini became coach of Serie D side Manzanese in 1993, but did not manage to save them from relegation. He then was in office at Ravenna as assistant manager until 1998, when he became head coach of Serie C2 team U.S. Triestina Calcio. He then joined Spezia from 1999 to 2002, winning Serie C2 at his first season and narrowly missing promotion to Serie B in 2002. After an eighth place with Vicenza in their 2002–03 Serie B campaign, he joined Atalanta and led them to promotion to Serie A. He stayed at Atalanta for the 2003–04 campaign too, but was sacked soon after the season start.

In January 2006, he was appointed at the helm of Serie B team Bologna, but was fired two months later. In December 2006, he joined Padova of Serie C1, leading them from the relegation zone to the battle for a spot in the promotion playoffs, then narrowly missed. In June 2007 he was announced as Siena boss in the 2007–08 Serie A, only to be sacked on 12 November after a poor start to the season.

In July 2008 he was announced as new head coach of newly promoted Serie B side Sassuolo. He guided the neroverdi through their debut season in the Italian second tier, leading Sassuolo to an impressive seventh place. He left Sassuolo by mutual consent in June 2009.

In November 2009 he was announced as new head coach of Romanian Liga I club CFR Cluj.

On 15 May 2010, Mandorlini guided CFR Cluj to a double: their second Romanian national title and the Romanian Cup as the first major managerial success in his career.

On 15 September 2010, Andrea Mandorlini was sacked by CFR Cluj due to a poor start in the season; his dismissal was announced only days before his UEFA Champions League debut against FC Basel. On 9 November 2010 he was announced as new head coach of Lega Pro Prima Divisione fallen giants Verona, as a replacement for dismissed boss Giuseppe Giannini.

His contract with Verona was renewed until 2014 on 11 October 2011. In his Verona stint, Mandolini succeeded in winning two promotions, bringing the team back to Serie A from the third tier, and maintaining it in a safe mid-table position throughout their 2013–14 comeback season in the top flight. On 30 November 2015, Mandorlini was sacked by Hellas after five years in charge and as the longest-serving Serie A coach at that time.

On 19 February 2017, Mandorlini returned into management as new head coach of Serie A club Genoa in place of Ivan Jurić, signing a one-and-a-half-year contract. On 10 April, Mandorlini was sacked and Jurić was reinstated.

He was hired as manager of Serie B club Cremonese on 24 April 2018. He was dismissed on 4 November 2018 following a negative start to the 2018–19 Serie B campaign.

On 20 January 2020, he returned to Padova in Serie C.

After almost two years without a job, on 21 February 2023 Mandorlini returned into management as the new head coach of Serie C club Mantova.

Personal life
Mandorlini has two sons: Davide and Matteo Mandorlini. Andrea's brother, Paolo, died in a car accident in 2013.

Managerial statistics

Honours

Player
Inter
 Serie A: 1988–89
 Supercoppa Italiana: 1989
 UEFA Cup: 1990–91

Manager
Spezia
 Serie C2: 1999–2000

CFR Cluj
 Liga I: 2009–10
 Romanian Cup: 2009–10
 Romanian Supercup: 2010

References

Sources

Living people
1960 births
Sportspeople from Ravenna
Association football defenders
Italian footballers
Italy under-21 international footballers
Serie A players
Serie B players
Torino F.C. players
Atalanta B.C. players
Ascoli Calcio 1898 F.C. players
Udinese Calcio players
Inter Milan players
Serie A managers
Spezia Calcio managers
L.R. Vicenza managers
U.S. Triestina Calcio 1918 managers
Atalanta B.C. managers
Bologna F.C. 1909 managers
Calcio Padova managers
A.C.N. Siena 1904 managers
U.S. Sassuolo Calcio managers
CFR Cluj managers
Hellas Verona F.C. managers
Genoa C.F.C. managers
U.S. Cremonese managers
Mantova 1911 managers
Italian football managers
Italian expatriate football managers
Expatriate football managers in Romania
UEFA Cup winning players
Serie B managers
Serie C managers
Footballers from Emilia-Romagna